On the Move: A Life is the second autobiography written by Oliver Sacks in 2015.

References

British autobiographies
Science autobiographies
2015 non-fiction books
Alfred A. Knopf books